Parthiv Gohil (born 18 February 1976) is a playback singer for Indian films including Devdas, Saawariya, Saheb Biwi Aur Gangster, and Kisaan. He is known in Gujarati Cinema for hit songs Aasmani, Thai Jashe, and Soni Gujarati Ni. He co-produced 2020 Romantic Gujarati movie Golkeri.

Background
Gohil was introduced to classical music by his great-grandfather and father. Aged 10, he began lessons with Smt. Bhanuben Solanki, Smt. Dakshaben Mehta, and Shri Laxmipati Shukla, a disciple of Omkarnath Thakur. Aged 14, he won the Pandit Omkarnath Thakur Competition, which was followed by the state talent search competition.

Under SPICMACAY's gurukul scholarship scheme, he was chosen to be trained under Zia Fariduddin Dagar, a descendant of Tansen. From him, Gohil learned the tenets of voice culture. Under the aegis of SPICMACAY, he accompanied maestros such as Hariprasad Chaurasia, Sultan Khan, the Gundecha Brothers and V. G. Jog on tanpura.

He was a runner-up in the TV show Sa Re Ga Ma, which was judged by Jasraj, Parveen Sultana, Khayyam, O P Nayyar, Kalyanji Anandji, Anil Biswas, and Jagjit Singh. Gohil is now hosting the same show on Alpha Gujarati channel of ZEE.

Gohil now lives in Mumbai. His work as a film singer started with the title song and some back vocals for Sanjay Leela Bhansali's film Devdas. He made his debut as a playback singer in Bhansali's film Saawariya, subsequently singing for films like EMI, Heroes, Vaada Raha, Kisaan, Saheb Biwi aur Gangster and others.

Gohil was the only Gujarati artist to be featured in the National Iconic Song "Phir Mile Sur Mera Tumhara". Recently, he was also featured on the MTV India show Coke Studio, along with artists like Ustad Rashid Khan and Richa Sharma. He popularized Gujarati Music through his live performances in India.

Personal life 
He is married to actress Manasi Parekh and has a daughter named Nirvi Gohil.

Filmography
Parthiv Gohil landed voice to many Hindi and Gujarati film songs. Here are the list of the movies.
 Bas Ek Chance
 Commitment
 Devdas
Desh Devi
 Dum
 EMI
 Family Circus
 Golkeri (2020)
 Heroes
 Hu Tu Tu Tu
 Jalsaghar
 Kevi Rite Jaish
 Kissan
Saawariya
Saheb Biwi Aur Gangster
 Oxygen
 Patel Ki Punjabi Shaadi
 Thai Jashe
Ventilator
 Vitamin She
 Nayika Devi: The Warrior Queen
 Medal (film)
 Kutch Express (film)

References

External links
 Parthiv Gohil website
 
Parthiv Gohil Age, Wife,Height and Facts

1976 births
Living people
Indian male playback singers
People from Bhavnagar
Gujarati people
Gujarati playback singers